Ptilotus obovatus (Gaudich.) F.Muell. is a shrub in the genus Ptilotus R.Br. that occurs in throughout arid Australia. It is commonly known as cotton bush.

References

obovatus
Endemic flora of Western Australia
Eudicots of Western Australia
Taxa named by Charles Gaudichaud-Beaupré